Stratos Vasileiou (born 12 December 1948) is a Greek hurdler. He competed in the men's 110 metres hurdles at the 1976 Summer Olympics.

References

1948 births
Living people
Athletes (track and field) at the 1976 Summer Olympics
Greek male hurdlers
Olympic athletes of Greece
Place of birth missing (living people)